Daniel John Lincoln (born 26 May 1995) is an English cricketer and footballer who plays as a goalkeeper for Dorking Wanderers.

Lincoln was born at Frimley in Surrey and attended Edgbarrow School at Crowthorne in Berkshire. He first played Minor Counties cricket for Berkshire County Cricket Club in 2012 and has continued to play for the side when available. After playing Second XI cricket in 2018 and 2018, in July 2019, Lincoln was registered by Middlesex County Cricket Club to play in the 2019 t20 Blast. He made his debut on 25 July 2019 against Gloucestershire, scoring 30 from 24 balls batting at number three. In November 2020, Middlesex announced they had released Lincoln. As well as Middlesex, Lincoln has played Second XI cricket for Gloucestershire, Hampshire, Kent, Northants and Warwickshire.

Lincoln made his first-class cricket debut on 11 July 2021, for Kent in the 2021 County Championship. Following a positive COVID-19 case in Kent's first XI, He was part of a side that was brought together for Kent's fixture against Sussex following a member of the county's First XI squad testing positive for COVID-19 which required the players involved in the county's previous match to all self-isolate. As a result, a number of Second XI players or "homegrown prospects" were drafted into the squad and made their senior debuts for the county.

Prior to playing for Middlesex, he played football as a goalkeeper in the Reading academy. He subsequently played non-league football for a number of clubs. In May 2021, Lincoln signed a one-year contract to play football for Harrow Borough. He had initially signed for the club in the curtailed 2020–21 season, but did not make a competitive appearance in that campaign. Following a spell back with Farnborough in November 2021, Lincoln joined National League South side Dorking Wanderers the following month.

Football statistics

References

External links
 

1995 births
Living people
English cricketers
Berkshire cricketers
Kent cricketers
Middlesex cricketers
English footballers
Association football goalkeepers
Reading F.C. players
Metropolitan Police F.C. players
Harrow Borough F.C. players
Farnborough F.C. players
Nuneaton Borough F.C. players
Hungerford Town F.C. players
Hayes & Yeading United F.C. players
Basingstoke Town F.C. players
Bognor Regis Town F.C. players
Braintree Town F.C. players
Hampton & Richmond Borough F.C. players
Dorking Wanderers F.C. players
National League (English football) players
Isthmian League players
Southern Football League players